Rawiri Taiwhanga (fl. 1818–1874) was a notable New Zealand tribal leader, farmer, Anglican missionary and teacher; of Māori descent, he identified with the Ngāpuhi iwi. He was the father of Sydney Taiwhanga.

Before his baptism he was known as Karaitiana Taiwhanga. On 7 February 1830 he was baptised, and took the name Rawiri Taiwhanga. He was the first high-ranking Māori to be converted to Christianity. This gave the missionary work of the Church Missionary Society led by the Rev. Henry Williams a great impetus, as it influenced many others to do the same.

References

Year of birth unknown
Year of death unknown
New Zealand schoolteachers
Ngāpuhi people
New Zealand Anglican missionaries
New Zealand Māori schoolteachers
New Zealand Māori religious leaders
Anglican missionaries in New Zealand